The men's 3x3 basketball tournament at the 2019 Southeast Asian Games was held at the Filoil Flying V Centre, San Juan, Metro Manila from 1 to 2 December. This was the first time 3x3 contest in the games. A tournament for women was also organized.

Venue
The 3x3 basketball tournament was played at the Filoil Flying V Centre in San Juan, Metro Manila.

The SM Mall of Asia Activity Center in Pasay was considered to host the 3x3 basketball competitions.

Results

Preliminary round

Final round

Semifinals

Bronze medal game

Final

See also
Women's 3x3 tournament

References

External links
  

Men 3x3